Professor Peter Ronald Andrews  is an Australian research scientist, biotechnology entrepreneur and was the first appointed Queensland Chief Scientist. He held the position from 2003 to 2010.

In 2004, Andrews was appointed an Officer of the Order of Australia (AO) "for service to scientific research, particularly drug design, and to the development of an Australian research-based pharmaceutical industry". He is a member of the governing council of the RiAus (Royal Institution of Australia), and was elected a Fellow of the Australian Academy of Technological Sciences and Engineering (FTSE) in 1995.

References

External links
Alchemia Ltd, www.bloomberg.com
Andrews, Peter Ronald (1943-), trove.nla.gov.au
Andrews, Peter Ronald (1943-), Encyclopaedia of Australian Science

Year of birth missing (living people)
Living people
Officers of the Order of Australia
21st-century Australian scientists
Fellows of the Australian Academy of Technological Sciences and Engineering